Volazocine is an opioid analgesic of the benzomorphan class which was never marketed.

Synthesis

See also 
 Benzomorphan
ketazocine
cyclazocine

References 

Analgesics
Benzomorphans
Opioids